The Xi'an Metro, also known as the Xi'an Rail Transit, is a rapid transit system in the city of Xi'an and the neighbouring city of Xianyang, in Shaanxi province, China.

The system has 8 lines in operation. Line 2 opened to the public on September 16, 2011. Line 1 began operation on September 15, 2013. Line 3 began operation after months of delay on November 8, 2016. Line 4 opened on December 26, 2018. Lines 5, 6, 9 opened in December 2020. Line 14 opened in September 2019 and extended in June 2021.

History
Initial proposals for a subway in Xi'an were created in the 70s which called for the Xi'an City Wall to be demolished to make way for a ring subway line. This was similar to what was done to create Beijing Subway Line 2, but the plan was scrapped due to successful opposition by preservationists and lack of funding for the project. Later, Xi'an began its planning a multiline metro system in the mid-1980s. In February 2004, the re-drafted plan was submitted to the State Government, which received final approval on September 13, 2006.

The first line, Line 2, began construction along Chang'an Street on 29 September 2006 and was completed in 2011. It runs north–south and passes under such historic sites as the Bell Tower and the Xi'an City Wall. It is estimated to have cost 17.9 billion yuan (US$2.24 billion). The route stretches from the Beikezhan to Weiqunan with 20 stops. The travel time is 39 minutes for the entire length, cutting the commute almost in half. Operations began on 28 September 2011.

Four other routes were planned to start construction in 2011 and to be finished by around 2020. When completed, the system will span  and will mainly service the urban and suburban districts of Xi'an and part of Xianyang.

On June 12, 2019, the NDRC approved the Phase III (2018-2024) Construction Plan of Xi'an Metro. The plan includes Line 1 (Phase 3), Line 2 (Phase 2), Line 8, Line 10 (Phase 1), Line 14, Line 15 (Phase 1), Line 16 (Phase 1). The total length of Xi'an Metro will be  in 2024.

Lines in operation

Line 1

The second route, Line 1, was scheduled to start in late 2009 but was brought one year earlier as per Chinese government's response to the Great Recession. Line 1 opened on 15 September 2013. The route runs from east to west.

To accelerate the speed of overall economic development between Xi'an and Xianyang cities, the Transportation Department of Xi'an decided to extend Line 1 to promote business travel between the two cities, as well as improve the efficiency of land use alongside Line 1. The preparation phase for the extension Line 1 started with the compilation of a feasibility study on November 4, 2007.

Line 2

Line 2 opened on 16 September 2011.

Line 3

Construction of Xi'an Metro's Line 3 broke ground in May 2011, began public trial testing on September 20, 2016, and was opened at November 8, 2016.

Line 4

Construction of test section of Line 4 of Xi'an Metro started in late 2012.

Line 4 started service on December 26, 2018.

Line 5

Line 6

Line 9

Line 14

The 29.31 km western section from Airport West (T1, T2, T3) to  opened on 29 September 2019.

Future development

On June 12, 2019, the NDRC approved the Phase III (2018-2024) Construction Plan of Xi'an Metro. The plan includes Line 1 (Phase 3), Line 2 (Phase 2), Line 8, Line 10 (Phase 1), Line 14, Line 15 (Phase 1), Line 16 (Phase 1). The total length of Xi'an Metro will be  in 2024.

Accidents
On 30 December 2008, a fire occurred that was extinguished within an hour; all workers evacuated safely. Just 66 hours later, on 2 January, another fire occurred at another station on Line 2.

On 26 May 2009, an individual suffered minor injuries from a fire during infrastructure work on Line 1.

On 2 August 2009, 9:20am, a cave-in at the Sajinqiao section of Line 1 trapped migrant workers under 10 cubic meters of earth for over three hours, hospitalizing at least two who later died at the hospital.

Network map

See also
 List of rapid transit systems

References

External links

 Official website

 
Railway lines opened in 2011
2011 establishments in China
Transport in Xi'an